Blippi is an American educational YouTube channel/video live-action program for toddlers and children up to the age of about five years old.

History
The show was created and the character originally played by Stevin John, who posted the first episode of the show on YouTube on February 18, 2014. Aiming to keep Blippi going, John joined the multi-channel network Moonbug Entertainment in 2020, which funds the series and other children's programs. It is dubbed in Spanish, French, Portuguese, German, Italian, Hebrew, Arabic,
Swedish, Danish and Polish.

Until May 2021, the Blippi character was only portrayed by Stevin John. On May 8, Clayton Grimm, who played Blippi in live performances, performed as Blippi for the first time on the channel and would host as an alternative Blippi with John. On October 9, 2021, Moonbug announced the addition of a new character named Meekah (played by Kaitlin Becker). The spin-off series Blippi's Treehouse started airing on December 1, 2021, on Amazon Kids+, with two more characters, Scratch and Patch (both are puppets).

Development 
The eponymous YouTube series features Blippi, an adult with a childlike curiosity and energetic persona, who wears a blue and orange beanie cap, orange glasses, blue shirt, orange suspenders, an orange bow tie, blue-grey skinny jeans and blue and orange sneakers.

Distribution 
In October 2020 Moonbug Entertainment partnered with Virgin Media to bring Blippi and other Moonbug programs to the United Kingdom. The show expanded to Southeast Asia in March 2021 when Moonbug partnered with POPS Worldwide to bring children's content to the POPS Kids app. Netflix acquired the streaming license to Blippi in January 2022.

Licensing and merchandise 
In 2019 Blippi signed a master toy deal with Jazwares LLC to sell a variety of merchandise such as toy vehicles, plush and educational toys based on the Blippi show, beginning in spring 2020.

In early 2020 Jazwares created "My Buddy Blippi," a plush toy that can recreate 15 of the character's sounds and phrases.

In January 2021 Blippi launched an educational toy line.

In addition to toys, books and more, Blippi merchandise also includes clothing.

Blippi The Musical 
Blippi The Musical is a live show produced by Round Room Live in partnership with Moonbug Entertainment, and was scheduled to tour North America in summer 2021. In previous tours of Blippi there had been some outcry as a result of the performances not being performed by Stevin John but by another actor. Originally scheduled in 2020, live performances were postponed due to the COVID-19 pandemic.

Blippi Wonders
Blippi Wonders is a  computer-animated children's web series based on Stevin John's Blippi. The series is about Blippi, along with either TABBS (an orange cat) or D.BO (a blue dog) on a blue car called the Blippi Mobile. The Blippi Mobile can change into many elements, such as wings and shrinking down. The series is produced by London-based Moonbug Entertainment, Italy-based Rainbow CGI and based on a Nova Scotia production services provided by IoM Media Ventures.

Reception

Nathan J. Robinson of Current Affairs criticized Blippi's programming, calling it "dead and sterile" and lacking intellectual curiosity that children can understand.

References 

23.  https://www.commonsensemedia.org/tv-reviews/blippi

External links

American preschool education television series
Moonbug Entertainment
YouTube channels launched in 2014
YouTube original programming